Chembirika 
(also known as Chembarika , Malayalam: ചെമ്പിരിക്ക) is a village in Chemnad grama panchayath, Kasaragod district, Kerala State, South India.

Tourism
Chembirika is famous for its beautiful beach experience and it has been caught by famous photographers from all over the country. This beach requires a well-planned beautification and development package from the side of Tourism department of Kerala.

A railway tunnel called Kalanad Tunnel, also known as Chembirika Tunnel is situated at the eastern part of Chembirika. It is the longest tunnel in Kerala which was constructed by the British government 110 years ago.

The picturesque view of Chembirika Beach and the Noombil River (also known as Chembirika River), which is considered to be the smallest river in Kerala, in which the river reaches to sea over here and it is often visited by tourists from nearby localities and from other districts of Kerala and sometimes it is rarely visited by tourists from other states of India and from the rest of the world. 

Melparamb is the nearest urban locality to Chembirika, at a distance of 2-3; km. There are some basic facilities like medics, education, shopping etc.

Kasaragod is the nearest major urban city to Chembirika, located 7 km away from it.

Schools

 GUPS Chembirika
 Chembirika Jama-ath English Medium School

Madrasas
 Dirayathul Islam Madrasa
 Sirajul Huda Sunni Madrasa
 Mubarak Madrasa

Places of worship

Masjids
 Chembirika Juma Masjid
 Mubarak Masjid
 Badar Masjid
 Noor Masjid
 Kallamvalappu Masjid
 Chathangai Juma Masjid
 Maani Masjid

Temples
 Shri Chandrashekhara Temple

Clubs and organizations.
 Framez of Chembirika
 NASC Chembirika
 Naya Padosi Chembirika
 Safdar Hashmi Chembirika
 Gally Boys Chembirika 
 STORE JUNCTION Chembirika

Shops
 C M A Merchant (grocery shop)
 Al-Ameen Store
 K H Centre
 Hotel Chembirika
 Top Tailors
 Chembirika Flour Mills
 Rajan merchant
 Kerala State Ration Shop
 Raheem Thattukada Kadappuram
 Al Mudees Store

Politics 
 Chembirika comes under Udma assembly constituency for Kerala State and it is a part of Kasaragod Lok Sabha constituency after the delimitation of parliament seats in India both are led by Communist Party of India (Marxist).
 Chembirika belongs to Chemnad Grama panchayath led by Indian Union Muslim League.
 Other Political parties like Indian National League, Indian Union Muslim League, Communist Party of Indiav(Marxist), Indian National Congress, Social Democratic Party of India, Aam Aadmi Party, People's Democratic Party and Welfare Party of India have their prominent and respective presence in Chembirika.

Transportation 
 The nearest railway station is Kalanad which is located 1.5 km away from Chembirika, in which the passenger (local) trains stop.
 The Kottikkulam railway station is located within a short distance of 8 km.
 The major railway station is Kasaragod railway station, which is commonly used for long journeys.
 The nearest airport is at Mangaluru, known as Bajpe/Mangaluru International Airport (IXE), which is situated 65 km away from Chembirika and 6.5 km away from Mangaluru City.
 Government transport (KSRTC) bus is the only bus transportation covering Chembirika. There are no private bus services in the area.
 Different types of taxis are available in nearby Melparamb Junction.

Tourist landmarks 
 Chandragiri Fort (2 km away from Chembirika)
The Chandragiri Fort is situated at [[Melparamb
]]. The fort is being damaged day by day because of its age in nature and negligence and dereliction by the authorities. From here we can catch a mindblowing view of nature. The fort is listed in the list of Kerala's heritage forts. 
 Kalanad Tunnel (0.5  km away from Chembirika)
It is the largest and oldest Tunnel in Kerala. The old tunnel was constructed in 1905 by the British. There is also a newer tunnel near to it, which was constructed in 2002.
 Chembirika Beach, located 0.7 km away from Chembirika.
 Chembirika Rocks, which is also located in Chembirika Beach.
 Kallamvalappu Beach (another beach South to Chembirika Beach) with one side surrounded by Arabian Sea and the other side surrounded by Noombil River.
 Chembirika river (Noombil River)
It is a famous landmark in which the two sides of this river are two resorts, Lalit Resorts and Holiday Resorts. The river meets the sea right here. The bird's eye view of this area got a chance to feature in Kerala's tourist spot pictures.
 The Holyday Bekal Resorts Ltd(1.5 km from Chembirika)
 The Lalith Resorts Ltd (5 km from Chembirika)
 Bekal Fort (30 minutes from Chembirika)
 Chembirika Maqam Sherif, located 1.33 km away from Chembirika and 3 km away from Melparamba.
 Paisavali River (30 mins from Chembirika)

References 
 
 

Suburbs of Kasaragod